The 1953–54 İstanbul Football League season was the 44th season of the league. Beşiktaş JK won the league for the 13th time.

Season

References

Istanbul Football League seasons
Turkey
1953–54 in Turkish football